The 1990 NBL season was the ninth season of the National Basketball League. The league expanded to 12 teams in 1990, with Hutt Valley, Otago and Waitakere joining the ranks. Waitakere replaced the outgoing Waitemata after Waitemata City amalgamated to form Waitakere City. In addition, North Shore was renamed North Harbour. Canterbury won the championship in 1990 to claim their third league title. In the NBL's first all-South Island final, Canterbury prevailed over Nelson in a gripping game, winning 76–73 to go back-to-back.

Final standings

Season awards
 Most Outstanding Guard: Jamie Dixon (Hawke's Bay)
 Most Outstanding NZ Guard: Byron Vaetoe (New Plymouth)
 Most Outstanding Forward: Kerry Boagni (Wellington)
 Most Outstanding NZ Forward/Centre: Glen Denham (Canterbury)
 Scoring Champion: Jamie Dixon (Hawke's Bay)
 Rebounding Champion: Willie Burton (Palmerston North)
 Assist Champion: Chris Harper (New Plymouth)
 Young Player of the Year: Kent Mori (Palmerston North)
 Coach of the Year: Matt Ruscoe (Nelson)
 All-Star Five:
 Kerry Boagni (Wellington)
 Willie Burton (Palmerston North)
 Jamie Dixon (Hawke's Bay)
 Kenny Stone (Nelson)
 Nenad Vučinić (Nelson)

References

National Basketball League (New Zealand) seasons
1990 in New Zealand basketball